IN-6, IN 6, or IN6 may refer to:

 Indiana's 6th congressional district
 Indiana State Road 6